Lim Kyung-Hee (or  ; born 16 November 1982 in Gyeonggi Province) is a South Korean long-distance runner. She competed in the marathon at the 2012 Summer Olympics, placing 76th with a time of 2:39:03.

References

1982 births
Living people
South Korean female long-distance runners
Olympic athletes of South Korea
Athletes (track and field) at the 2012 Summer Olympics
Athletes (track and field) at the 2016 Summer Olympics
Sportspeople from Gyeonggi Province
Athletes (track and field) at the 2010 Asian Games
Asian Games competitors for South Korea